Musikene or the Higher School of Music of the Basque Country (Basque - Euskal Herriko Goi-Mailako Musika Ikastegia; Spanish - Centro Superior de Música del País Vasco) is a higher education music school located in San Sebastián, in the Basque region of Spain. It was founded in 2001 by the Basque Government through the establishment of a private foundation.

The school was housed on the Miramar Palace. In 2012, the construction of a new building, which houses the school since the 2016–2017 academic year, began next to the San Sebastián campus of the University of the Basque Country.

External links
Musikene official website

2001 establishments in Spain
Music schools in Spain
Educational institutions established in 2001
Arts organizations established in 2001
Conservatory
Conservatory